Tradimento  is the third studio album by Italian rapper Fabri Fibra. It was also his first LP to be distributed by a major label, the Universal Music Italia.

The production is covered mainly by his rapper and younger brother Nesli who produces 12 out of 17 tracks and the remainder are by Italian hip-hop producer Fish as well as Dj Nais. The album was certified platinum by the Federation of the Italian Music Industry.

Tradimento is considered the album that opened the hip hop music to the great audience in Italy, giving to it mainstream popularity.

Background
After his underground success with his second studio album Mr. Simpatia he signed a contract with Universal, a major label, and this was considered a betrayal by his older fans, so he decided to call the album Tradimento, which means betrayal. But even if he signed with a major label he decided to keep his hardcore style which attacks various political and social downsides.

Track listing

Charts

Certifications

References

2006 albums
Fabri Fibra albums
Universal Music Italy albums